The 64th Group Army, former 64th Corps and 64th Army Corps, was a military formation of China's People's Liberation Army that existed from 1949 to 1998.

Chinese Civil War and Korean War
The 64th Corps was created in January 1949 under the Regulation of the Redesignations of All Organizations and Units of the Army, issued by Central Military Commission on 1 November 1948, basing on the 4th Column of the Jinchaji Military Region. Its lineage could be traced to the Jizhong Column formed in 1945.

As of its formation, the Corps was composed by 3 divisions: 190th, 191st and 192nd.

The Corps was a part of 19th Army Group. It took part in many battles, especially the Pingjin Campaign during the Chinese Civil War.

In October 1950, Artillery Regiment, 64th Corps activated. From February 1951 the regiment was renamed as 171st Artillery Regiment. In January 1951 the corps was re-equipped with Soviet-built small arms.

In February 1951 the Corps entered Korea with all its subordinated divisions as a part of People's Volunteer Army. During its deployment in Korea, it took part in the Fifth Phase Offensive, during which the corps suffered heavy losses by indirect fire at the riverbank of Imjin River, but made significant territorial gains against the confronting U.S. 24th Infantry Division.

Port Arthur
In August 1953 the corps pulled out of Korea and stationed in Fengcheng, Liaoning, and later moved to Andong, Liaoning.

In February 1955, as Soviet 39th Army withdrawing from Port Arthur area, PLA 63rd Corps, with all its three divisions and reinforced by 170th Artillery Regiment from 63rd Corps, Independent Tank Regiment of Huabei Military Region, and 1st Public Security Division, moved into Port Authur to receive equipment left by the Soviet Army.
190th Infantry Division, reinforced by Independent Tank Regiment of Huabei Military Region and 170th Artillery Regiment, received equipment from Soviet 7th Mechanized Division, stationed in Xiajiahezi;
191st Infantry Division received equipment from 17th Guards Rifle Division, stationed in Jinzhou District;
192nd Infantry Division received equipment from 19th Guards Rifle Division, stationed in Lüshunkou District.
1st Public Security Division, reinforced with Independent Regiment of People's Volunteer Army and 16th Independent Anti-Aircraft Artillery Battalion, received equipment from 25th Guards Machine-Gun Artillery Division, and became 1st Machine-gun Artillery Division. The division then temporarily attached to the 64th Corps.

After the relieving, 190th Infantry Division, now as 1st Mechanized Division (1st formation), detached from the corps. In March 1953, 21st Railway Security Division joined the corps and renamed as 190th Infantry Division(2nd formation).

In 1955, 171st Artillery Regiment and 89th Anti-Aircraft Artillery Regiment were activated.

In June 1956, 1st Machine-gun Artillery Division detached from the corps.

64th Army Corps
In April 1960 the corps was renamed as 64th Army Corps. The corps was then composed of:
Corps Headquarter
171st Artillery Regiment
89th Anti-Aircraft Artillery Regiment
190th Army Division
568th Infantry Regiment
569th Infantry Regiment
570th Infantry Regiment
570th Artillery Regiment
191st Army Division
571st Infantry Regiment
572nd Infantry Regiment
573rd Infantry Regiment
571st Artillery Regiment
396th Tank Self-Propelled Artillery Regiment
192nd Army Division
574th Infantry Regiment
575th Infantry Regiment
576th Infantry Regiment
572nd Artillery Regiment
397th Tank Self-Propelled Artillery Regiment

In March 1961 190th Army Division(2nd formation) was disbanded.

In August 1961, 1st Mechanized Division, now as 190th Army Division(3rd formation), rejoined the army corps.

In June 1963 the army corps moved to Benxi, Liaoning.

Vietnam War and Zhenbao Island
From January to August 1968, anti-aircraft artillery detachments from the Army Corps moved to North Vietnam to take part in the Vietnam War. During its deployment in Vietnam, the unit allegedly shot down 4 USAF aircraft and damaged 3:
On 15–16 March, Anti-Aircraft Artillery Battalion, 192nd Army Division (reinforced with 4th Battery, Anti-Aircraft Artillery Regiment, 64th Army Corps) shot down 2 F-4C/F-105 fighters and damaged other 3;
On 28 March, Anti-Aircraft Artillery Battalion, 191st Army Division shot down 2 F-4C fighters.
However, none of these claims could be confirmed by U.S. sources.

From November 1968 to May 1970, Reconnaissance Company, 190th Army Division, Reconnaissance Company, 191st Army Division, and 57 mm Recoilless Rifle Company, Artillery Battalion, 572nd Infantry Regiment, 191st Army Division were deployed to Zhenbao Island for up-coming border conflict with the Soviet Army. However, the composite unit did not take part in direct engagement.

In January 1976, the 3rd Independent Tank Regiment of Shenyang Military Region joined the army corps as Tank Regiment, 64th Army Corps.

In 1983, 62nd Artillery Division and 82nd Pontoon Bridge Regiment were attached to the army corps.

64th Army
In September 1985, the army corps was renamed as 64th Army(), and its structure was completely re-organized:
62nd Artillery Division and 82nd Pontoon Bridge Regiment detached from the army.
All army divisions were renamed as infantry divisions.
190th Infantry division was classified as northern motorized infantry division, catalogue A; one of its three infantry regiments was mechanized, and all three infantry regiments had tank battalions.
191st and 192nd Infantry Divisions were classified as northern infantry division, catalogue B.
Tank Brigade, 64th Army was activated from Tank Regiment, 64th Army Corps.
Artillery Brigade, 64th Army was activated from Artillery Regiment, 64th Army Corps.
Anti-Aircraft Artillery Brigade, 64th Army was activated from AAA Regiment, 64th Army Corps.
Engineer Regiment was activated.
Communications Regiment was activated.

In summer 1989, 190th Infantry Division took part in the enforced martial law and the crackdown on protests in Beijing, without suffering casualties.

In 1992, 1st Anti-Aircraft Artillery Brigade (62nd Artillery Division before 1985), 82nd Pontoon Bridge Regiment and 10th Engineer Regiment were attached to the army, and former Anti-Aircraft Artillery Brigade, 64th Army and Engineer Regiment, 64th Army were disbanded. Outer Changshan Garrison Division and 2nd Garrison Brigade of Shenyang Military Region(later Coastal Defense Regiment of Shenyang Military Region) were also attached.

Disbandment
In 1998 the army was disbanded.
190th Motorized Infantry Division were transferred to 39th Army;
191st Infantry Division were reduced to a brigade and transferred to Liaoning Provincial Military District;
192nd Infantry Division was inactivated and became a reserve formation;
Outer Changshan Garrison District (former garrison division) and Coastal Defense Regiment of Shenyang Military Region were also transferred to Liaoning Provincial Military District's control;
Tank Brigade, 64th Army, along with other formations, were disbanded.

As of its disbandment, the army was composed of:
Army Headquarter
Engineer Regiment
Communications Regiment
82nd Pontoon Bridge Regiment
190th Motorized Infantry Division
568th Infantry Regiment
569th Infantry Regiment
570th Infantry Regiment
Tank Regiment
Artillery Regiment
Anti-Aircraft Artillery Regiment
191st Infantry Division
571st Infantry Regiment
572nd Infantry Regiment
573rd Infantry Regiment
Artillery Regiment
192nd Infantry Division
574th Infantry Regiment
575th Infantry Regiment
576th Infantry Regiment
Artillery Regiment
Outer Changshan Garrison District
Coastal Defense Regiment of Shenyang Military Region
Tank Brigade
Artillery Brigade
Anti-Aircraft Artillery Brigade

Notable commanders
Zeng Siyu
Ge Zhenfeng

References 

Field armies of the People's Liberation Army
Military units and formations established in 1949
Military units and formations disestablished in 1998
Shenyang Military Region